Raul Justo Bocanegra (born July 13, 1971) is an American politician, and a former member of the California State Assembly. He is a Democrat who represented the 39th Assembly District, encompassing northeastern San Fernando Valley.

Bocanegra was first elected to the assembly in 2012, but was narrowly defeated in his 2014 bid for reelection by political outsider and fellow Democrat Patty Lopez. He reclaimed his previous assembly seat after defeating Lopez in 2016. Before being elected to the assembly, he was an urban planner and chief of staff to his predecessor Felipe Fuentes. A native of the San Fernando Valley, he graduated from San Fernando High School.

On November 27, 2017, Bocanegra announced he would resign, effective immediately, as a result of sexual harassment allegations.

2009 groping incident

In 2009, Bocanegra worked as a staff member for then assembly member Felipe Fuentes.

In October 2017, Elise Flynn Gyore, who worked as a staffer for a state senator at the time, alleged that Bocanegra "put his hands into her blouse" outside of a bathroom at a night club in Sacramento. Flynn Gyore did not know Bocanegra at the time. The next day, she reported the incident to the Senate sergeant who conducted an investigation which concluded that it was "more likely than not that Mr. Bocanegra engaged in [that] behavior that night". In October 2017, Flynn Gyore made her allegation public.

The revelation of the incident prompted the California Legislative Women's Caucus to call upon the legislature to review the incident and "immediately enforce, for once, the bodies’ zero-tolerance policies." An editorial  in the Los Angeles Daily News called for Bocanegra's resignation and condemned those who knew about the groping yet helped him rise in his career. The group, We Said Enough, called on him to resign. Local activists, including former assembly member Patty López, who defeated Bocanegra in 2014 and lost to him in 2016, demonstrated outside Bocanegra's district office. Los Angeles Unified School District Board Member Kelly Gonez issued a statement saying "It’s not enough to admonish a staffer or legislator to stay away from his victim," and commending Gyore for speaking out.

Elections

2014

2016

References

External links 
 Campaign website
 Join California Raul J. Bocanegra

Democratic Party members of the California State Assembly
Politicians from Los Angeles
Living people
Mexican-American people in California politics
1971 births
21st-century American politicians
People from Pacoima, Los Angeles
Hispanic and Latino American state legislators in California
University of California, Los Angeles alumni